Schwielowsee is a lake in the state of Brandenburg, Germany. It is situated to the south and west of the city of Potsdam. The villages of Caputh, Ferch and Geltow, on the banks of the lake, form the municipality of Schwielowsee.

The navigable River Havel flows through the eastern end of the lake, entering it at Caputh via a short channel from the Templiner See, and exiting to the north. The lake is also navigable to its south-western end at Ferch. Navigation is administered as part of the Untere Havel–Wasserstraße.

References

External links

 Potsdamer Brandenburger Havelseen, Tourist information

Lakes of Brandenburg
Federal waterways in Germany